Nadine Ann Marie Spencer is a Jamaican-born Canadian businesswoman, activist and philanthropist. She is the chief executive officer of BrandEq Agency, a marketing and communications agency and CEO of the Black Business and Professional Association (the "BBPA").

Early life
Spencer grew up in Kingston, Jamaica, and emigrated to Toronto, Canada at the age of 12. She graduated from York University with an Honours Bachelor of Arts Degree in Political Science in 1987.

Career
Spencer has owned several businesses in the antique, food, and marketing field. She also created "The Food Network Presents: The Delicious Food Show", which featured celebrity chefs Padma Lakshmi, Colin Cowie, Lynn Crawford, Mark McEwan, and David Rocco. 

She is currently the chief executive officer of BrandEQ Group Inc and the CEO of the Black Business and Professional Association (BBPA).

Spencer is also serves on York University's Board of Governors as of May 2021.

Business and DEI
Spencer is a significant contributor on topics such as business, women, and diversity. She has participated in discussions with the White House on issues related to anti-discrimination and equity for women and girls of colour.

Spencer has been featured in The New York Times, Bloomberg, Women's Post, The Toronto Star, The Toronto Sun and other trade journals, as well as TV appearances that include Breakfast Television, City-Line and PBS’s Find!.

She is featured on the Successful Black Women Entrepreneurs & Executives list, along with Oprah Winfrey, Michele J. Hooper and Michelle Gadsden-Williams.

Awards
Spencer has won numerous awards for her achievements, including:
 The UN Volunteer Award
 Harry Jerome Award for Business
 Dale Carnegie Highest Achievement Award for Public Speaking

References

External links 
 

1967 births
Living people
Businesspeople from Toronto
Jamaican women in business
York University alumni
People from Kingston, Jamaica
Canadian women in business
Jamaican emigrants to Canada